Betim Januzaj (born 29 March 1995), known professionally as Buta, is a Kosovo-Albanian rapper.

Life and career

1995–2013: Early life and career beginnings 

Betim Januzaj was born on 29 March 1995 into an Albanian family in the city of Ferizaj, then part of the FR Yugoslavia, present Kosovo. He discovered his passion for music at an early age and began writing songs at the age of twelve. In 2010 he released his first and only song for that year titled "Guillotine". In 2011 he released a number of singles under the name "butacrunk" on YouTube. In 2012 he joined the musical collective Ham Skwad Global and released his first videoclip named "Kqyre" which was part of his first mixtape named "Rolling Stoned Vol. I". In 2013 he released "Rolling Stoned Vol. II".

2014-2016
In 2014 Buta released another music videoclip and another single "200 kmh" & "Flex". At the end of 2014 he moved out of Ferizaj to Tirane where he studied economics at "Universiteti Mesdhetar i Shqipërisë".
In 2015 Buta released EP named "Z. Ndjenja". In this EP you can hear Buta's trap influence and his unique sound whereas his older songs which were influenced by Hip Hop. Buta claims he's always been into trap and was inspired by artists such as Lil Wayne. In 2016 Buta released EP named "Dr. Zhivago". Dr. Zhivago was particularly important due to the song "Hashish Thaqi" which is one of his most streamed songs of all time.  In late 2016 he released the EP "Nino Brown" in collaboration with Pllug Bois.

2017: Early life and career beginnings 
In February 2017, he signed contract with the Albanian music label Nesër. In July 2017, he announced his follow-up single "Mbi Re" in collaboration with Albanian rapper Ledri Vula and peaked at number seventeen in Albania. On 1st of May 2017 he released "Pranvere / Vere '17" with hits such as "Sorry". Mc Kresha also featured in this album in the song "Opps". In November 2017 Buta released the single "Z. Ndjenja 2". In December 2017, he collaborated with German-Albanian rapper Dardan on the single "Tango & Cash", which peaked at eighty four in Albania.

2018–present: Upcoming album and continued success 

In 2018, Januzaj almost released seven singles, including "Anuloje", which experienced moderate success throughout the Albanian-speaking World. In May 2018, he collaborated a second time with Albanian rapper Ledri Vula on the number one single "Merri Merri". In August 2018, he performed at the Sunny Hill Festival in Pristina along other acclaimed artists such as Action Bronson, Martin Garrix and Dua Lipa. The following year, he premiered the singles "24/7", reaching the number twelve in Albania, and "Edi Rama", which became his second number one single.

In December 2019, "Edi Rama" was released and went on to reach number one in Albania simultaneously becoming the rapper's second number one single in his native country. He signed a record deal with the German subsidiary of Universal Music in December 2021 to release his upcoming third studio album.

Artistry 

The musical work of Januzaj incorporates hip hop and trap music. He cites a wide array of musical artists as influences, including numerous hip hop performers, such as 50 Cent, Cam’ron, Gucci Mane, Lil Wayne, T.I. and Young Jeezy. He takes influence from the different genres of music he discovered when he was young, including from the hip hop and new school movements.

Discography

Albums 
Pranvere / Vere '17 (2017)
Vjeshte / Dimer '18 (2018)

Extended plays 
Z. Ndjenja (2016)
Dr. Zhivago (2016)
Punë Skuadre (2017)
Z. Ndjenja 2 (2020)
Babayega (2021)

Singles

As lead artist

As featured artist

References 

1995 births
Living people
21st-century Albanian rappers
21st-century Albanian male singers
Albanian hip hop singers
Albanian songwriters
Kosovan rappers
Trap musicians
Kosovo Albanians
Kosovan people of Albanian descent
People from Ferizaj
Universal Music Group artists